Bembidion coloradense is a species of beetle in the family Carabidae. It is found in Canada and the United States.

References

External links

 

coloradense
Beetles described in 1897
Beetles of North America